Stephen Bone (13 November 1904 – 15 September 1958) was an English painter, writer, broadcaster and noted war artist. Bone achieved early success in book illustration using woodcuts before he turned to painting and art criticism.

Early life

Stephen Bone was born in Chiswick in west London, the son of Sir Muirhead Bone, an artist, and Gertrude Helena Dodd, a writer. After leaving Bedales School he travelled widely in Europe with his father before enrolling at the Slade School of Fine Art in 1922. He became disillusioned with the Slade and left in 1924 to begin illustrating books, with woodcuts, for his mother and other writers. In 1925 he was awarded the Gold Medal for Wood Engraving at the International Exhibition in Paris. In 1926 he was the subject of a joint exhibition at the Goupil Gallery, alongside Rodney Joseph Burn and Robin Guthrie, and in 1928 he painted a mural for the underground station at Piccadilly Circus.

In 1929 Bone married the artist Mary Adshead, and they were to have two sons and a daughter. The couple travelled extensively across Britain and Europe, which allowed Bone to paint outdoors in all weathers and to develop a style of bright landscape painting that proved popular and sold well at a number of gallery exhibitions.

During the 1930s, Bone exhibited at the Fine Art Society, at the Leferve Gallery, the Redfern Gallery and in 1936 exhibited a series of 41 paintings of British counties at the Ryman Gallery in Oxford. During 1936 and 1937 he painted and exhibited in Stockholm.

World War II

At the outbreak of the Second World War, Bone enlisted as an officer in the Civil Defence Camouflage Establishment based in Leamington Spa. In June 1943 Bone was appointed by the War Artists' Advisory Committee to be a full-time salaried artist to the Ministry of Information specialising in Admiralty subjects. The post had originally being held by Stephen's father, Muirhead Bone, but following the death of Gavin Bone, Stephen's brother, Muirhead decided not to continue with the commission. Stephen produced a large quantity of works around Great Britain, showing coastal installations and naval craft, including several works painted on-board submarines. He witnessed and sketched the 1944 Normandy landings, painted scenes in Caen and Courseulles after the invasion, and went on to record the assault on Walcheren Island in the Netherlands. Toward the end of 1945 he travelled to Norway and painted the wreck of the Tirpitz. In Norway, he also recorded captured naval bases and observed a number of mass graves of, mostly, Soviet prisoners of war.

Later life
After the War, Bone found his style of painting somewhat out of fashion and, although he continued to paint, he found it difficult to get his work exhibited. He became an art critic for the Manchester Guardian, wrote humorous pieces for the Glasgow Herald and did television and radio work for the BBC. With his wife, he wrote and illustrated children's books. Together they organised a mural painting course at Dartington. In 1957, Bone was appointed the director of the Hornsey College of Art.  He died of cancer on 15 September 1958 at St Bartholomew's Hospital, London.

Selected bibliography 
 1921: Mr Paul (Jonathan Cape), a novel by Gertrude Bone, woodcuts by Stephen Bone, 
 1921: The Furrowed Earth (Chatto & Windus), by Gertrude Bone with woodcuts by Stephen Bone
 1922: A Farmers' Life (Cape), by G. Bourne, illustrated by Stephen Bone
 1923: Selected Poems (Cape), by W. H. Davis, illustrated by Stephen Bone
 1924: Oasis (Cape), with Gertrude Bone
 1925: Of the Western Isles (T. N. Foulis), "forty woodcuts by Stephen Bone, with letterpress by Gertrude Bone",
 1928: The Hidden Orchis (London: Medici Society), with Gertrude Bone
 1930: The Cope (Medici), with Gertrude Bone
 1936: The Little Boy and His House (J. M. Dent), children's picture book by Bone and Mary Adshead,  
 1937: The West Coast of Scotland, Skye to Oban (Batsford); later issued by Faber as a Shell Guide
 1939: Albion: an Artist's Britain (A. & C. Black)
 1942: The Silly Snail and Other Stories (Dent), Bone and Adshead
 1946: British Weather, Britain in Pictures no. 97 (Collins)
 1948: The Military Orchid, (Bodley Head), by J.Brooke, illustrated by Stephen Bone
 1951: The English and Their Country (Longmans, Green), Stephen Bone with illustrations by Muirhead Bone, 
 1953: The Little Boys and Their Boats (Dent), Bone and Adshead,

References

External links

 
  Works by Stephen Bone in the Imperial War Museum collection
  (including "from old catalog")
 Gertrude Bone at LC Authorities, 7 records, and at WorldCat

1904 births
1958 deaths
20th-century English male artists
20th-century English painters
Alumni of the Slade School of Fine Art
Artists from London
Stephen
British illustrators
British war artists
Camoufleurs
English male painters
English people of Scottish descent
People educated at Bedales School
People from Chiswick
World War II artists